Guangfu railway station is a railway station located in Guangfu, Hualien, Taiwan. It is located on the Taitung line and is operated by the Taiwan Railways Administration.

Around the station
 Hualien Sugar Factory
 Matai'an Wetland Ecological Park

References

1913 establishments in Taiwan
Railway stations in Hualien County
Railway stations opened in 1913
Railway stations served by Taiwan Railways Administration